The Carstairs House Tramway operated between Carstairs railway station and Carstairs House between 1888 and 1895.

History

The tramway was built by Joseph Monteith who owned Carstairs House. The construction engineers were Anderson and Munro, Electrical Engineers, 136 Bothwell Street, Glasgow.

Its purpose was to provide transport for his family and guests to and from Carstairs railway station. He pioneered the use of hydroelectric power, and constructed a power station at Jarviswood to provide electricity for the house and tramway.

The system was described in the Leeds Times of Saturday 18 May 1889 as follows:

Closure

Electric services probably ceased around 1895 and then the line was operated for goods traffic using horse power for a few more years. The remains of the tramway were sold in the 1930s.

References

Tram transport in Scotland
2 ft 6 in gauge railways in Scotland
Carstairs